The Eparchy of Banat is an ecclesiastical territory or eparchy of the Serbian Orthodox Church in the Banat region, Serbia. It is mostly situated in the autonomous province of Vojvodina, while the eparchy also includes a small south-western part of Banat that belongs to the City of Belgrade as well as village of Ostrovo that belongs to the city of Požarevac. The seat of the eparchy is in Vršac.

History

The Serbian Orthodox Eparchy of Vršac was one of several eparchies created on the territory of Banat during the 16th century under the jurisdiction of the Serbian Patriarchate of Peć. By the time of the accession of Serbian patriarch Makarije I (1557), much of the Banat region was already conquered by the Turks, who took over Temeswar in 1552. The region was organized as a Turkish eyalet (province) named the Eyalet of Temeşvar.

During Turkish rule in the 16th and 17th centuries, Banat was mainly populated by Serbs (also called Rascians) in the west and Vlachs (Romanians) in the east. In some historical sources it was referred to as Rascia and in others as Wallachia. Both Serbs and Romanians in Banat were Orthodox Christians. In some parts of Banat, Serbs were so numerous that the entire region was sometimes called "Rascia" ("the land of the Serbs", 1577).

At the beginning of the Austro-Turkish War (1593–1606), in the spring of 1594, Serbs in Banat started an uprising against Turkish rule. The local Romanians also participated in this uprising. Rebels took Vršac and various other towns in Banat and started negotiations with Prince of Transylvania. One of the leaders of the uprising was Serbian Orthodox Bishop Theodore.

During the Austro-Turkish War (1683–1699), Serbian patriarch Arsenije III sided with Austrians and appointed Spiridon Štibica as the new Bishop of Vršac in 1694. Austrian troops took over parts of Banat, and the Eparchy of Vršac was officially recognized as a diocese of the Serbian Orthodox Church by charter of emperor Leopold I in 1695.

Under the Treaty of Karlowitz (1699) the Banat remained under Turkish administration. At the beginning of the Austro-Turkish War (1716–1718), when Prince Eugene of Savoy took the Banat region from the Turks, Serbian Bishop of Vršac was Mojsije Stanojević. He sided with the Austrians and secured official confirmation. After the Treaty of Passarowitz (1718), the region became an Austrian province and was renamed as the Banat of Temeswar.

The Eparchy of Vršac at first went under the jurisdiction of the Serbian Orthodox Metropolitanate of Belgrade. During the Austro-Turkish War (1737–1739), Serbian Patriarch Arsenije IV sided with the Austrians and made his residence in Sremski Karlovci. The Eparchy of Vršac remained under the jurisdiction of the Serbian Orthodox Metropolitanate of Karlovci, until 1920, when the united Serbian Patriarchate was re-created.

During the 18th and 19th centuries, the prominent Serbian bishops of Vršac were Jovan Đorđević, who became Metropolitan of Karlovci in 1769, and Josif Rajačić, who became Metropolitan of Karlovci in 1842 and Serbian Patriarch in 1848.

During the First World War (1914–1918), many Serbian priests and parish councilors of the Eparchy of Vršac were persecuted, imprisoned or sent to concentration camps by the authorities of Austria-Hungary. The region of Banat was liberated and united with Serbia in 1918, becoming part of newly created Kingdom of Serbs, Croats and Slovenes (Yugoslavia). The new border with Romania was established in 1919. The Eparchy of Vršac was reorganized and renamed as the Eparchy of Banat in 1931.

During the Second World War, the territory of the eparchy was occupied by forces of Nazi Germany from 1941 to 1944. German forces committed numerous atrocities against orthodox Serbs in Banat and also against local Jews and Gypsies. After the Liberation in 1944 and the establishment of new communist regime in Yugoslavia, the Eparchy of Banat was kept under constant political pressure, until the collapse of the communist one-party system (1988–1990).

Monasteries
Vojlovica monastery near Pančevo. Old monastery, founded in the 15th–16th century.
Mesić monastery near Vršac. Old monastery, founded in the 15th–16th century.
Središte monastery near Vršac. Old monastery, founded in the 15th–16th century.
Bavanište monastery near Kovin. By local tradition, founded in the 15th–16th century and destroyed in 1716. Rebuilt in 1858.
Holy Trinity monastery in Kikinda. New monastery,  built in 1885–1887 as a foundation of Melanija Nikolić-Gajčić.
Saint Melanija monastery in Zrenjanin. New monastery, founded in 1935 by bishop Georgije Letić.
Hajdučica monastery near Plandište. New monastery, founded in 1939.

Bishops

From the middle of 16th century up to the beginning of the 18th century, under the jurisdiction of the Serbian Patriarchate of Peć, Bishops of Vršac were styled as titular metropolitans, as was customary for all diocesan bishops. Later, under the jurisdiction of the Serbian Orthodox Metropolitanate of Karlovci, diocesans of Vršac were simply styled as bishops. Title was changed from "Vršac" to "Banat" after territorial reorganization in 1931.

Bishops of Vršac
Teodor (1594)
Simeon (1619)
Antonije (1622)
Teodosije (1662)
Spiridon Štibica (1694–1699)
Mojsije Stanojević (1713–1726)
Nikola Dimitrijević (1726–1728)
Maksim Nestorović (1728–1738)
Jeftimije Damjanović (1739)
Isaije Antonović (1741–1748)
Jovan Đorđević (1749–1769)
Vikentije Popović-Hadžilovac (1774–1785)
Josif Jovanović Šakabenta (1786–1805)
Petar Jovanović Vidak (1806–1818)
Maksim Manuilović (1829–1833)
Josif Rajačić (1833–1842)
Stefan Popović (1843–1849)
Emilijan Kengelac (1853–1885)
Nektarije Dimitrijević (1887–1895)
Gavrilo Zmejanović (1896–1919)
Ilarion Radović (1922–1929)

Bishops of Banat
Georgije Letić (1931–1935)
Irinej Ćirić (1935–1936; administrator of the eparchy)
Vikentije Vujić (1936–1939)
Damaskin Grdanički (1939–1947)
Visarion Kostić (1951–1979)
Sava Vuković (1980–1985; administrator of the eparchy)
Amfilohije Radović (1985–1990)
Atanasije Jevtić (1991–1992)
Hrizostom Stolić (1992–2003)
Nikanor Bogunović (2003–present)

See also
Serbian Orthodox Church
Religion in Serbia
Religion in Vojvodina
List of the Eparchies of the Serbian Orthodox Church

References

Sources

 Шематизам Српске православне епархије вршачке за годину 1898, Вршац 1899.
 Иларион Зеремски, Српски манастири у Банату, њихов постанак, прошлост и одношај према Румунима, Сремски Карловци 1907.
 
 Радослав Грујић, Духовни живот, in : Војводина (collection of papers), књ. 1, Нови Сад 1939, стр. 330–414.
 
 
 
 
 
 
 
 
 

 Банат кроз векове, Београд 2010. (collection of papers)

External links
 Official site of the Eparchy of Banat

Banat
Banat
Banat
Banat
Banat
Banat
Banat